Blackwood railway station was a station on the Sirhowy Railway. It served the town of Blackwood, Caerphilly.

History

The station opened on 19 June 1865 by the Sirhowy Railway after the conversion of the Sirhowy Tramroad to a standard gauge railway. The station had a signal box, which was eventually destroyed. Due to competition from bus services in the area, the station met its demise to passenger services on 13 June 1960, though the last train ran on the 11th. Goods traffic ceased on 8 February 1965.

Present day

Almost nothing of the station and route currently exists. The National Cycle Network route 467 between Blackwood and Hollybush follows a lot of former trackbed of the railway.

Notes

References

Route

Former London and North Western Railway stations
Railway stations in Great Britain opened in 1865
History of Monmouthshire
1865 establishments in Wales
Disused railway stations in Caerphilly County Borough
Railway stations in Great Britain closed in 1960
1960 disestablishments in Wales